Satarupa gopala, the large white flat, is a species of skipper butterfly found in parts of the Indomalayan region  
, including India, Malaya, Thailand, Laos, China and Vietnam. It is the type species for the genus Satarupa.

Subspecies
Satarupa gopala gopala (Sikkim, Assam, northern Thailand, Laos, northern Vietnam, Hainan)
Satarupa gopala malaya vans, 1932

References

Butterflies described in 1865
Butterflies of Asia
Butterflies of Indochina
Tagiadini
Taxa named by Frederic Moore